Mirza Muhammad Nikusiyar, also known as Timur II was a claimant to the throne of India. He had been in prison from 1681 to 1719 and initiated a war to seize the throne in 1719. He was son of rebel Muhammad Akbar, grandson of Aurangzeb and was brought up in a harem in Agra. In 1695 he was 16 was appointed subedar of Assam until 1701. In 1702 The Prince appointed Subehdar of Sindh by Aurangzeb he served until 1707.

The local Minister Birbal (not the Birbal of Akbar's fame) used him as puppet and proclaimed him emperor, but since the prince had spent his life inside harem and talked like a catamite, he was laughingly ignored and again put in jail by the Syed Brothers. Neku Siyar died in 1723 at age of 43.

War of Succession and fate
On 18 May 1719, the local governor of Agra; Birbal, brought out Prince Nekusiyar from his harem prison and, in order to enhance his own powers, proclaimed him Emperor of India at Agra Fort.

However, an ambition so grand could not be accomplished, and the Syed Brothers defeated both Nekuseyar and Birbal by June and deposed both of them from their former posts.

Nekusiyar was arrested on 13 August 1719, and again placed in his old harem prison at Agra. However, soon after, he was moved to Salimgarh in Delhi. Siyar died in Persia on 12 April 1723 at the age of 43.

Ancestry

References

External links
REVIEWS: Sounding the death knell

1723 deaths
1679 births
Mughal princes
Timurid dynasty